Holdsworth was a bicycle manufacturer in London, England.

Holdsworth may also refer to:

Holdsworth (surname)
Holdsworth, West Yorkshire, England
Mount Holdsworth, a mountain of Antarctica
Holdsworth Glacier, a glacier of Antarctica
Holdsworth Motorhomes, a defunct British company
Holdsworth (cycling team)